Rykhtychi is a selo in Drohobych Raion, Lviv Oblast, Ukraine. It belongs to Drohobych urban hromada, one of the hromadas of Ukraine.

It was first mentioned in 1123 and currently has a population of 3,244.

References

External links
 Rykhtychi
 Photos of Rykhtychi
 Info about Rykhtychi
 Drohobych Region
 Official website of Drohobych

Villages in Drohobych Raion